Embassy of Ukraine in Greece is the diplomatic mission of Ukraine in Athens, Greece.

History of the diplomatic relations
Greece recognized the independence of Ukraine on December 31, 1991. Diplomatic relations between two countries were established on January 26, 1992. In May 1992, Ukraine opened an Honorary Consulate in the Hellenic Republic. Embassy of Ukraine in Athens was opened in June 1993.

See also
 Greece–Ukraine relations
 List of diplomatic missions in Greece
 Foreign relations of Greece
 Foreign relations of Ukraine

References

External links
 

Greece–Ukraine relations
Greece
Ukraine
Buildings and structures in Athens